Jinan–Laiwu high-speed railway is a high-speed railway in Jinan, Shandong Province, China. The expected journey time between the two terminii is 22.5 minutes.

History
Plans for the railway were confirmed in 2017. Construction started in September 2019. The railway opened on 30 December 2022.

An extension to Linyi North railway station in Linyi on the Rizhao–Lankao high-speed railway is under planning. It will be renamed as Jinan–Laiwu–Linyi high-speed railway after the extension.

Stations

References

High-speed railway lines in China